A terminal market is a central site, often in a metropolitan area, that serves as an assembly
and trading place for commodities. Terminal markets for agricultural commodities are usually at or near major transportation hubs. One of the models of a Terminal Market is a Hub-and-Spoke model wherein the Terminal Market is the hub which is to be linked to a number of collection centers - the spokes.

The term is also used for markets in other commodities such as metals and bullion.

List of terminal markets (fresh produce)

California 
 Alemany Farmers' Market – San Francisco, CA
 Ferry Plaza Farmers Market & Ferry Building Marketplace – San Francisco, CA

Los Angeles 
 Grand Central Market – Los Angeles, CA
 Los Angeles Farmers Market – Los Angeles, CA
 Olvera Street – Los Angeles, CA

Florida 
 Yellow Green Farmers Market (2010–present) — Hollywood, FL

Georgia 
 Ponce City Market – Atlanta, GA
 Sweet Auburn Curb Market (1918–present) – Atlanta, GA

Illinois

Chicago 
 Chicago farmers' markets Chicago, IL 
 Chicago International Produce Market - Chicago, IL
 Maxwell Street Market – Chicago, IL

Indiana 
 Indiana - farmers' markets, IN

Louisiana 
 Crescent City Farmers Market – New Orleans, LA
 French Market – New Orleans, LA

Maryland

Baltimore 
 Cross Street Market – Baltimore, MD
 Hollins Market – Baltimore, MD
 Lexington Market (1782–present) – Baltimore, MD

Massachusetts 
 Boston Public Market – Boston, MA
 Haymarket – Boston, MA
 New England Produce Center - Chelsea, MA

Michigan 
 Eastern Market – Detroit, MI

Missouri 
 Soulard Market – St. Louis, MO

Montana 
 Midtown Global Market – Minneapolis, MN

New York (state)
 Troy Flea – Troy, NY

New York City 
 Bronx Terminal Market - Bronx, NY
 Brooklyn Flea – Brooklyn, NY
 Fulton Fish Market New York, NY
 Grand Central Market – New York, NY
 Hunts Point Cooperative Market - Bronx, NY
 La Marqueta – New York, NY
 Union Square Greenmarket – New York, NY

Ohio 
 Findlay Market (1855–present)– Cincinnati, OH
 North Market – Columbus, OH
 PNC Second Street Market – Dayton, OH
 West Side Market – Cleveland, OH

Oregon

Portland 
 James Beard Public Market (future) – Portland, OR
 Portland Public Market (1933–1942) – Portland, OR
 Portland Saturday Market (1974–present) – Portland, OR

Pennsylvania 
 Broad Street Market – Harrisburg, PA
 Italian Market – Philadelphia, PA
 Lancaster Central Market – Lancaster, PA
 Reading Terminal Market (1893–present) – Philadelphia, PA

Rhode island 
 Providence Terminal Produce Market - Providence, RI

South Carolina 
 City Market - Charleston, SC

Tennessee 
 Chattanooga Market (2001–present) – Chattanooga, TN

Texas 
 Dallas Farmers Market – Dallas, TX

Virginia 
 City Market – Petersburg, VA. Built in 1878–79 and listed on the National Register of Historic Places

Washington (state) 
 Pike Place Market (1907–present) – Seattle, WA

Washington, D.C. 
 Eastern Market – Washington, D.C.
 Union Market – Washington, D.C.

Wisconsin 
 Milwaukee Public Market (2005–present) – Milwaukee, WI

References 

Wholesale markets
Agricultural terminology
Commodities
Food markets in the United States